The SS Kaiser Franz Joseph I was a Austro-Hungarian passenger liner built by Cantiere Navale Triestino for the Austro-American line. After her launching, in February 1912 the steamer was put into service and she set off from Trieste to Buenos Aires. During World War 1 the ship was laid up in Trieste, but was commissioned by the Italian navy after the war. the Kaiser Franz Joseph I now the Presidente Wilson of the Cosulich Line, was sold to other Italian company until World war 2 happened. During The war she was commissioned by the Italians navy once again and was laid up in La Spezia in 1943. On May 12, 1944, as the Allies Advance to Italy the ship was Scuttled by the Germans to pervert capture. Her wreck was raised and scrapped in 1949.

History
The keel of the ship was laid down on the Cantiere Navale Triestino shipyard in Monfalcone. She was christened on September 9, 1911 by, Archduchess Maria Josepha and Navy Commander Admiral Count Rudolf Montecuccoli and was Launched on the same day. And in the next year, she set off from Trieste her maiden voyage to Buenos Aires and on May 25, 1912, she left Trieste to New York. When World War 1 broke out, the Kaiser Franz Joseph I was in Trieste and where she also laid up there during the war. In 1918, after the Armistice of Villa Giusti and the surrender of Austria-Hungary, the ship was Commission by the Italian Navy as a troop transport ship and was renamed Generale A. Diaz.

In 1919 as she was sold to the Cosulich Line and she was renamed to the Presidente Wilson. And on May 5, 1919 she set off on its first post-war voyage from Genoa to New York city with mainly returning US soldiers on board. On September 12, 1919, she left Trieste on her third journey in peacetime with 97 passengers in first, 371 in second and 623 in third class. In 1929 she would made her last voyage for the Cosulich Line before sold to the Lloyd Triestino and was renamed after the Indian river in the same name. She was than sold to the Adriatica di Navigazione and was renamed Marco Polo after modernization work. She resumed service between Trieste, Venice, Brindisi, Alexandria as well as Haifa and Beirut route. in 1940 When World War 2 broke out, the ship was decommissioned for passenger service and served as a troop transport ship until she was laid up in La Spezia in 1943. On May 12, 1944, as the Allies Advance to Italy the ship was Scuttled by the Germans. In 1949 the wreck was raised and scrapped.

Design
When Launched, Kaiser Franz Josef I was the largest Austro-Hungarian ocean liner. She had a capacity of 1905 passengers (125 in first class, 550 in second class, and 1230 in third class), a tonnage of 12,567 GRT, a Length of 145.54 m (477 ft 6 in) and a Beam of 18.35 m (60 ft 2 in). She was powered by, 2 x 4 cylinder triple expansion steam engines that powered, dual shaft that powered the, two screws Propeller which give the ship a speed of around 19 knots (35 km/h; 22 mph).

Citations

External links

Gallery

1911 ships
All articles to be expanded
World War I passenger ships of Austria-Hungary
Ocean liners
Ships of Austria-Hungary
Passenger ships of Italy